Ring Hill Airport  is a privately owned, public use airport in Penobscot County, Maine, United States. It is located one nautical mile (2 km) west of the central business district of Carmel, Maine.

Facilities 
Ring Hill Airport covers an area of 8 acres (3 ha) at an elevation of 340 feet (104 m) above mean sea level. It has one runway designated 16/34 with a turf surface measuring 1,100 by 60 feet (335 x 18 m).

See also 
 List of airports in Maine

References

External links 
 Aerial image and Topographic map from USGS The National Map
 Aeronautical chart at SkyVector

Airports in Penobscot County, Maine